Christina Jo Ellertson (born May 20, 1982) is an American former professional soccer defender and former member of the United States women's national soccer team.

Early life 
Ellertson was born and grew up in Vancouver, Washington. The daughter of a Nigerian mother and a Ghanaian father who migrated to the U.S., she played soccer throughout her childhood.

University of Washington
Ellertson originally signed to attend Santa Clara University but instead went to the University of Washington. The decision was hard since, at age 18, she gave birth to her daughter, MacKenzie. She competed in soccer throughout college to become one of UW's most respected forwards. She was named Pacific-10 Conference co-player of the year in 2003 and player of the year in 2004.

Playing career

Club
On September 16, 2008, Ellertson was one of the three players drafted for Saint Louis Athletica in the Women's Professional Soccer allocation of national team members, with the new league starting in April 2009. Ellertson was a consistently solid presence in the Athletica back line, logging 1748 minutes for the season, the most on the team. She played as team captain whenever Lori Chalupny was not on the field, made the All-Star team and was nominated for WPS's Defender of the Year award.

When Saint Louis folded in May 2010, Ellertson moved to Atlanta Beat alongside teammates Hope Solo and Eniola Aluko. After 16 games and two goals for the Beat, Ellertson left by mutual consent in February 2011. She moved to a new franchise, magicJack, and quickly became a cornerstone of the team's defense, producing notable performances against Marta and Kelly Smith.

Ellertson has also played previously for the Seattle Sounders of the W-League.

In February 2013, she was chosen in the first round of the National Women's Soccer League's supplemental draft by Portland Thorns FC, despite having stated that she would not be playing in the league. Nevertheless, she ultimately joined the Thorns a few months later, on July 31, after being repeatedly approached by Coach Cindy Parlow Cone. Ellertson made five appearances for the Thorns, including an appearance as a substitute during the team's victory in the inaugural NWSL Championship match.

In February 2014, Ellertson announced that she was retiring from the Thorns to focus on coaching and her family.

International
After April Heinrichs's reign as coach, Ellertson tried out for the women's national soccer team, and earned her first cap against Ukraine on July 10, 2005. New coach Greg Ryan moved her to defender. She was named to the U.S. roster for the 2007 FIFA Women's World Cup and competed against Nigeria during group stage, against Brazil in the infamous semi-final in which Hope Solo was benched in favor of more experienced Briana Scurry, and against Norway in a 4–1 win in the third-place playoff match.

On December 13, 2008, at the Home Depot Center in Los Angeles, Ellertson scored her only international goal against China in her final USWNT game, and in her only start at forward; a 1–0 game winner.

Personal life
Ellertson married Brad Ellertson, with whom she had two daughters, Mackenzie (born 2000) and Mya (born 2007), and a son Mason (born 2015). Before her marriage, she played under her maiden name, Frimpong. Her twin sister, Crystal Frimpong, played soccer at the University of Florida.

References

External links

 
 
 US Soccer player profile 
 Saint Louis Athletica player profile
 Washington Huskies player profile
 

1982 births
Living people
American sportspeople of Ghanaian descent
American sportspeople of Nigerian descent
Sportspeople from Vancouver, Washington
Seattle Sounders Women players
Soccer players from Washington (state)
United States women's international soccer players
Washington Huskies women's soccer players
Saint Louis Athletica players
Atlanta Beat (WPS) players
MagicJack (WPS) players
USL W-League (1995–2015) players
American women's soccer players
Portland Thorns FC players
2007 FIFA Women's World Cup players
Women's association football defenders
National Women's Soccer League players
African-American women's soccer players
21st-century African-American sportspeople
21st-century African-American women
20th-century African-American people
20th-century African-American women
Women's Professional Soccer players
Twin sportspeople